The Revenue On-Line Service (ROS), is a pioneer in European internet applications, and it is run by Revenue Commissioners in the Republic of Ireland. The ROS system allows companies and other business concerns who are liable for tax in the Republic of Ireland to file certain tax returns online using a secure site facility.  Originally it used the Java Virtual Machine for the application process, but moved to a JavaScript process in 2016. Users download ("retrieve") a digital certificate, which is in the form of a PKCS 12 file. This acts as their signature would on a normal paper form.  ROS is estimated to be used by 60% of all taxpayers and over 80% of tax agents.

ROS has been developed as part of Revenue's overall customer-service strategy. In addition to the current filing and payment options available to customers they are now extending these options to include Internet filing. The purpose of the exercise is to make it as easy as possible for Irish taxpayers to comply with their return filing and payment obligations. The existing paper based filing system remains an option.

Users who have used ROS have found that the system makes processing faster as returns are processed on a nightly basis. ROS provides customers and agents with round the clock access to their tax and revenue accounts.

Some of the tax forms which can be filed on ROS
 P45 (details of employee leaving work)
 P35 (yearly summary of employer's taxes)
 P30 (monthly summary of employer's taxes)
 Form 11 (income tax)
 CT1 (corporation tax)
 VAT3 (value added tax)
 DWT (Withholding tax)
 F35 (yearly professional services return)
 SSIA (special savings incentive account)
 Vehicle registration form
 VRT40 (vehicle registration tax)
 Vehicle birth cert form
 Intrastat
 RCT 35 (yearly RCT return)
 VIES
 Payment forms

External links
Office of the Revenue Commissioners

Taxation in the Republic of Ireland
Economy of the Republic of Ireland
Department of Finance (Ireland)